Gypsies of the Night is a 1932 German film directed by Hanns Schwarz and starring Jenny Jugo, Hans Brausewetter, and Paul Kemp. A separate French-language version Happy Hearts was also released.

The film's sets were designed by the art director Ernö Metzner. It was partly shot on location at Hamburg Harbour.

Cast
Jenny Jugo as Lissy
Hans Brausewetter as Karl
Paul Kemp as Julius
Anton Pointner as Oliver
Paul Heidemann as Steffan
Egon Brosig as Andreas
Theo Lingen as Theo
Willi Schur as Phill
Julius Falkenstein as Jeweller von Holst
Alfred Beierle as Detective Commissioner

References

External links

Films of the Weimar Republic
Films directed by Hanns Schwarz
German multilingual films
Bavaria Film films
German black-and-white films
Films scored by Paul Abraham
1932 multilingual films
1930s German films